Radosław Marcinkiewicz (born 1 March 1986) is a Polish freestyle wrestler. He won one of the bronze medals in the 86 kg event at the 2015 European Games held in Baku, Azerbaijan.

He competed in the 92kg event at the 2022 World Wrestling Championships held in Belgrade, Serbia.

Achievements

References

External links 
 

Living people
1986 births
Place of birth missing (living people)
Polish male sport wrestlers
Wrestlers at the 2015 European Games
European Games bronze medalists for Poland
European Games medalists in wrestling
20th-century Polish people
21st-century Polish people